Yrrol: An Enormously Well Thought Out Movie is a Swedish comedy film which was released to cinemas in Sweden on 28 October 1994, directed by Peter Dalle. The roles are played by comedians from the TV series Lorry and some characters from the TV show are in the film.

Awards
Peter Dalle and Rolf Börjlind won the Guldbagge Award for Best Screenplay and Suzanne Reuter for Best Actress in a Leading Role.

References

External links

Swedish comedy films
1994 films
1990s Swedish films